Hopelink is a social services nonprofit agency based in  Redmond, Washington. The CEO is Catherine Cushinberry. It serves north and east King County, Washington, with food banks, energy assistance, housing, a family development program, transportation and adult education.  Founded in 1971, it is one of the largest nonprofits in the state of Washington, employing about 275 people with an annual budget of about $61,000,000.

Hopelink has presented an annual Reaching Out Benefit Luncheon, one of the biggest fundraising events in the state. Past guest speakers have included Queen Latifah, Tererai Trent, Jill Biden, Tom Colicchio, John Legend, Lisa Ling, Edward James Olmos, Christopher Gardner, Mark Kennedy Shriver and Donald Driver.

References 

Non-profit organizations based in Redmond, Washington
Organizations established in 1971
Poverty-related organizations
Hunger relief organizations
1971 establishments in Washington (state)